Assumption Convent may refer to:

 Assumption Convent, former name of Assumption College San Lorenzo, a school in San Lorenzo Village, Makati, Philippines
 Assumption Convent, other name of Assumption Iloilo, a school in Iloilo City, the Philippines
 Assumption Convent School (Thailand), a school in Bangkok, Thailand
 Assumption Convent School, Germiston, a private school in Gauteng, South Africa.
 Convent of the Assumption, a school in Sidmouth, Devon, England
 Our Lady of the Assumption Convent, Warwick, a former Roman Catholic convent in Warwick, Australia